Western Market is a market that was located in the city of Washington, D.C. It originally opened in 1802 and closed in 1961.

History

Original Market
Western Market was one of the three marketplaces planned in Pierre L'Enfant's plan for Washington, DC. It also included Center Market and Eastern Market. It was opened in 1802 on 20th and H Streets, in the block between H and I Streets NW, 20th and 21st Streets NW, and Pennsylvania Avenue NW. This market closed in 1856.

Second Market
After its closing, Western Market moved to a new location at 21st and K Streets NW. This market closed in 1961 and was demolished to make room for an office building to be built on that block. This left Eastern Market to be the only one of the original three markets (Western, Center, and Eastern) left open.

Appearance

Original Market
It is unknown what the market located at 20th and H Streets looked like.

Second Market
The second building of Western Market (located at 21st and K Streets) was large and made of brick. One side was higher than the other. It was similar in style to the current Eastern Market building.

Purpose
In Pierre L'Enfant's original city plan, the three markets (Western, Center, and Eastern) existed to supplement existing markets in Alexandria and Georgetown. Western Market had similar products and purposes to the current Eastern Market.

See also
Eastern Market
Center Market

References

Buildings and structures in Washington, D.C.
Buildings and structures demolished in 1961
Capitol Hill
Commercial buildings completed in 1802
Food markets in the United States